Dana Harris Porter (January 14, 1901 – May 13, 1967) was a Canadian politician and jurist. Porter was a member of the Ontario Legislature from 1943 to 1958 serving as a representative for Toronto St. George and was appointed Chief Justice in 1958. He was the first chancellor of the University of Waterloo.

Early life and education
Porter was born January 14, 1901, in Toronto. His father, Dr. George Porter, was the director of health services at the University of Toronto and his brother was hockey player John Porter, who went on to serve as executive vice-president at Simpsons.

After graduating from the University of Toronto Schools, Porter earned an undergraduate degree from the University of Toronto in 1921. He continued his studies in England at  Balliol College, Oxford from which he graduated with a master's degree in 1923. He returned to Toronto where he earned a law degree from Osgoode Hall. After being called to the bar he joined the firm of Fennel, Porter & Davis.

Career
Porter entered politics in 1943 winning a seat in the Legislative Assembly of Ontario representing the downtown Toronto riding of St. George in the 1943 provincial election. First serving as parliamentary assistant to then Premier George A. Drew, Porter went on to be named Minister of Planning and Development. During his fifteen-year career in the Legislature was elected five times, never once losing an election.

In 1958, Porter left politics to accept an appointment as Chief Justice of the Ontario Court of Appeal. He made a notable ruling in 1964, lifting a ban on the book Fanny Hill.

Porter was the first chancellor of the University of Waterloo, serving from 1960 to 1966. The university's arts library was named the Dana Porter Arts Library following Porter's death in 1967.

Personal life
Porter married his wife Dorothy (née Parker) in 1929. Together they had two sons - Dana Jr. and Julian. in his spare time he enjoyed gardening, painting and reading, and had an extensive knowledge of Shakespeare.

Death
Porter died of cancer on May 13, 1967, at Wellesley Hospital in Toronto. Following his death Ontario's Supreme Courts were recessed from May 15 until after his funeral, with county courts also closing at noon on the day of the service. The funeral was held on May 16 at the Metropolitan United Church in Toronto. Led by Reverend Arthur B. B. Moore, nearly 1,000 were in attendance. Among the 23 honorary pallbearers were former prime minister John Diefenbaker, former Ontario premier John Robarts and author Claude Bissell. Following the service, Porter's body was interred at Mount Pleasant Cemetery.

See also
 List of University of Waterloo people

References

External links
 

1901 births
1967 deaths
Attorneys General of Ontario
Judges in Ontario
University of Toronto alumni
Chancellors of the University of Waterloo
Members of the United Church of Canada
Politicians from Toronto
Progressive Conservative Party of Ontario MPPs
Finance ministers of Ontario
Provincial Secretaries of Ontario
20th-century Canadian lawyers
Alumni of Balliol College, Oxford